Bharat Shumsher Jung Bahadur Rana was a Nepalese politician. 

In 1960, Rana was arrested in the coup d'état led by King Mahendra, however, he was released next year, following his support for the Nepalese royal family. He also produced many Bengali movies. He also produced the Satyajit Ray's much-acclaimed movie Seemabaddha. 

He died on 10 August 2018 in Kolkata.

References 

1930s births
2018 deaths
Year of birth uncertain
Nepalese exiles
Nepalese prisoners and detainees
Prisoners and detainees of Nepal
People from Kathmandu
B
Nepalese revolutionaries
Nepalese Hindus
Nepalese political party founders
Nepalese politicians
20th-century Nepalese politicians
21st-century Nepalese politicians

Bengali film producers